Arrowsmith Lake is a lake located on Vancouver Island east of Mount Arrowsmith.

Access
Drive to the northwest bay gate, up the 155 main for  bridge over Englishman river; up another ; left to lake and dam (note that there is a gate here and it may be locked); another  from the gate.

References

Alberni Valley
Lakes of Vancouver Island
Cameron Land District